Follin may refer to:

First name
 Follin Horace Pickel (1866-1949), Quebec physician and politician

Middle name
 Frances Follin Jones (1912–1999), American Classicist and the former curator 

Surname
 Eugène Follin (1823–1867), French surgeon and ophthalmologist
 Mike Follin, a computer game programmer
 Richie Follin, American guitarist, keyboard player, singer songwriter in many bands like The Willowz, Guards, CRX
 Tim Follin (born 1970), a video game music composer

Others
Follin, American musical duo made up of Richie and Madeline Follin

See also
 Folin (disambiguation)